Dermot Gallagher (born 20 May 1957 in Ringsend, Dublin, Ireland) is a retired Irish association football referee, who lives in Banbury, Oxfordshire. He refereed in the Premier League of English football until May 2007.

Career
Gallagher first took up the whistle in 1978 at the suggestion of an ex-Football League linesman called Dick Bartlett. He was elected to the assistant referees' list of the Football League in 1985. Five years later he became a Football League referee at the age of only thirty-three. Even by his second season he was regularly handling top division games and was chosen for the new Premier League in 1992. He progressed to the FIFA list in 1994 after only three and a half seasons on the List.

His first ever Premiership appointment was the 2–0 away win by Coventry at Spurs on 19 August 1992, both goals being scored by John Williams.

In 1995, he refereed the FA Charity Shield match between Everton and Blackburn Rovers at Wembley, which Everton won with a Vinny Samways goal. In the same year, he was man-in-the-middle for the FA Trophy Final, also at Wembley, when Woking beat Kidderminster Harriers 2–1 after extra time. And to finish a busy year he was put in charge of the Under 20 World Cup Final in Qatar, which was won by Argentina in a 2–0 win over Brazil.

In 1996, he was selected to control the FA Cup Final between Liverpool and Manchester United at Wembley, which United won by an Eric Cantona goal to nil. That summer he refereed in the European Championships in England. However, he suffered a serious injury during a game and was then out of action until early 1997.

Despite being born in the Republic of Ireland, Gallagher was a representative of the (English) Football Association, and as such he was able to referee a friendly international between his birth country, the Republic of Ireland, and Russia on 13 February 2002 at Lansdowne Road. Referees are prohibited from officiating in international fixtures involving their representative country. He retired from the FIFA List on reaching the mandatory retirement age of forty-five at the end of that year.
Since retiring Dermot often attends matches supporting the Republic of Ireland football team.

Gallagher served out several more years as a Premier League referee with the unique distinction of having served on it every season since its inception. He was the first referee since 1994 to be granted an extension beyond the domestic retirement age of forty-eight in 2006.

Since the year 2006, he has officiated in the annual series of national six-a-side tournaments called Masters football, referees for which are FA-endorsed. This competition features ex-professional footballers chosen by the PFA, and is televised on Sky TV.

The last Premier League fixture that he refereed was the game between Liverpool and Charlton Athletic, which took place on 13 May 2007 and finished 2–2.

Statistics

See also
List of football referees
Premier League All Stars

References

Print

Football League Handbooks, 1985–1989
Rothmans / Sky Sports Football Yearbooks, 1990–2006

Internet

External links
Dermot Gallagher Referee Statistics at soccerbase.com
7 questions with Dermot Gallagher

1957 births
Living people
Sportspeople from County Dublin
Republic of Ireland football referees
Premier League referees
FA Cup Final referees
UEFA Euro 1996 referees
Irish expatriate sportspeople in England
Expatriate sportspeople in England